Daniel Mulhall (born 8 April 1955) is a retired Irish diplomat and a former Ambassador of Ireland to the United States. He has also been Ireland's Ambassador to the United Kingdom, Germany and Malaysia.

Education
Born in Waterford, Ireland, Mulhall studied at University College Cork. He received a BA degree in 1975, a Higher Diploma in Education in 1978, and an MA in history in 1979.

Career
Mulhall joined Ireland's Department of Foreign Affairs in 1978 as Third Secretary in the Economics Division. He then moved to the department's Development Cooperation Division, and was later posted in 1980 to the embassy in New Delhi. In 1983, Mulhall moved back to Dublin to work in the Political Division.

Mulhall then became First Secretary at the Embassy of Ireland in Vienna, followed by a posting to the Permanent Representation to the European Union in Brussels in 1990. In 1995, he became Counsellor of the Press Division of the Department of Foreign Affairs. In 1998, he was installed as the first Consul General of Ireland in Edinburgh.

In October 2001, Mulhall was appointed to the post of Ambassador to Malaysia and was also accredited to Laos, Thailand and Vietnam. He was the Irish government's representative during the 2004 Indian Ocean earthquake and tsunami and helped "get survivors home as part of the Irish emergency response efforts". Mulhall returned to Dublin in 2005 as the Assistant Secretary of the European Union Division of the Department.

In November 2009, he became Ireland's Ambassador to Germany. His posting to Berlin coincided with the Irish financial crisis.

In 2013, he was posted to the Irish Embassy in London as the Ambassador to the United Kingdom. Mulhall was the Irish Ambassador when the UK voted to leave the European Union in 2016. He campaigned against Brexit, as was Irish government policy, and later spoke of his "personal sadness" that Brexit is "threatening to reverse decades of improving relations since peace was established". He said that Irish-British relations "had been neglected" in the referendum. He called on the British government to remain in the Customs Union "to minimise the impact of Brexit on the Good Friday Agreement".

In March 2017, it was announced that Mulhall would become the 18th Ambassador of Ireland to the United States later that year.

In August 2017, he arrived in Washington DC and presented his credentials to US President Donald Trump when he was officially installed as Ambassador to the US.

In March 2022 New York University announced that after his retirement from the Department of Foreign Affairs in August 2022 Mulhall would become  global distinguished  professor in Irish studies, teaching an undergraduate seminar, "Literature as History: Ireland 1880-1940".

Mulhall is Parnell Fellow at Magdalene College, Cambridge for 2022-23.

Awards and honours
In July 2017, Mulhall was awarded the Freedom of the City of London.

On 4 March 2019, he was made a freeman of his native city of Waterford.

In November 2019, he was named Honorary President of the Yeats Society.

Publications
 George Russell — a literary witness to Irish history, History Ireland
 A New Day Dawning: A Portrait  of Ireland in 1900, The Collins Press, Cork, 1999
 How the European Union Helped the U.K. and Ireland Move From War to Peace, Time, 2016
 The Shaping of Modern Ireland: A Centenary Assessment, with Eugenio Biagini, Irish Academic Press 2016
 The Emerald Isle Has Friends On Both Sides of the Aisle, Foreign Policy, 2019
 Leopold Bloom, the anti-nationalist star of 'Ulysses', is an ambassador for our day, Washington Post, 2022
 Ulysses: A Reader's Odyssey, New Island Press, 2022

References

External links

1955 births
Living people
People from Waterford (city)
Ambassadors of Ireland to the United Kingdom
Ambassadors of Ireland to the United States
Ambassadors of Ireland to Germany
Ambassadors of Ireland to Malaysia
Alumni of University College Cork
People from County Waterford
20th-century Irish people
21st-century Irish people
21st-century diplomats
Irish diplomats